The James C. McGroddy Prize for New Materials is a prize that has been awarded annually by the American Physical Society since 1975, but was only given that name following its endowment by IBM in 1999. Prior to that it was known as the International Prize for New Materials. The recipients are chosen for "Outstanding achievement in the science and application of new materials". The prize is named after James C. McGroddy, himself a winner of APS's George E. Pake Prize in 1995, and comes with a cash award of $10,000.

Recipients 
Source:  American Physical Society
 2022: Daniel C. Ralph
 2021: Darrell G. Schlom, Ivan Božović, James N. Eckstein
 2020: Mikhail Eremets
 2019: , Claudia Felser, Xi Dai
 2018: Rodney S. Ruoff
 2017: Paul C. Canfield
 2016: Mercouri Kanatzidis
 2015: Hideo Hosono
 2014: Zhong Lin Wang
 2013: Costas M. Soukoulis, David R. Smith, John B. Pendry
 2012: Robert Cava
 2011: Arthur P. Ramirez
 2010: Nicola A. Spaldin, Ramamoorthy Ramesh, Sang-Wook Cheong
 2009: , William L. Johnson
 2008: Arthur F Hebard, 
 2007: Arthur J. Epstein, Joel S. Miller
 2006: Alex Zettl, Hongjie Dai
 2005: Yoshinori Tokura
 2004: Loren Pfeiffer
 2003: Charles M. Lieber
 2002: Donald S. Bethune, Sumio Iijima
 2001: Arthur Charles Gossard
 2000: M. Brian Maple
 1999: Eugene E. Haller, Thomas Richard Anthony
 1994: Peter Grünberg, Albert Fert, Stuart Parkin
 1993: Gordon C. Osbourn
 1992: Robert F. Curl, Harold W. Kroto, Richard E. Smalley
 1991: Francis J. DiSalvo, Jr., Frederic Holtzberg
 1990: James L. Smith, Hans R. Ott, Frank Steglich, Zachary Fisk
 1989: J.B. MacChesney, R.D. Maurer, Charles K. Kao
 1988: J. Georg Bednorz, Paul C. W. Chu, K. Alex Muller
 1987: Dan Shechtman
 1986: John Croat, Jan Herbst, Norman C. Koon, Masato Sagawa
 1985: Leroy L. Chang, Leo Esaki, Raphael Tsu
 1984: J. P. Remeika
 1983: David Turnbull
 1982: John R. Arthur, Jr., Alfred Y. Cho
 1981: LeGrand G. van Uitert
 1980: Pol E. Duwez, William Klement, Jr.
 1979: J. Eugene Kunzler, Bernd T. Matthias, John K. Hulm
 1978: J. H. Sinfelt
 1977: Francis Bundy, H. Tracy Hall, Herbert Strong, Robert H. Wentorf, Jr.
 1976: William G. Pfann, Henry C. Theurer
 1975: Heinrich Welker

See also

 List of physics awards

External links 
James C. McGroddy Prize for New Materials, American Physical Society

Awards of the American Physical Society
Awards established in 1975